British Library, Add MS 14449, designated by number 69 on the list of Wright, is a Syriac manuscript of the New Testament, according to the Peshitta version, on parchment. Palaeographically it has been assigned to the 6th or 7th century.

Description 

It contains the text of the four Gospels according to Peshitta version, on 197 leaves (12⅞ by 9¾ inches). The leaves 31-197 were torn. The original number of quires was 22. The writing is in two columns per page, 22-25 lines per page. The writing is in fine, large Estrangela. Many Syriac vowels were added by a later hand. Some lessons are rubricated.

The text is divided according to the Ammonian Sections, with references to the Eusebian Canons. They are marked in an ordinary way, and at the food of each page are given a harmony of the four Gospels. It contains subscriptions at the end of each Gospel.

On folio 197 verso there is a note made by a modern hand.

The manuscript was brought from the covenant of St. Mary Deipara. It was described by William Aldis Wright.

The manuscript is housed at the British Library (Add MS 14449) in London.

See also 

 List of the Syriac New Testament manuscripts
 Syriac versions of the Bible
 Biblical manuscript
 British Library, Add MS 14455
 British Library, Add MS 17124

References

Further reading 

 William Wright, Catalogue of the Syriac manuscripts in the British Museum (London: British Museum, 1870), pp. 46–47.

Peshitta manuscripts
6th-century biblical manuscripts
7th-century biblical manuscripts
Add. 14449